is a Japanese former Nippon Professional Baseball infielder.

References 

1970 births
Living people
Baseball people from Saitama Prefecture 
Japanese baseball players
Nippon Professional Baseball infielders
Chunichi Dragons players
Chiba Lotte Marines players
Tohoku Rakuten Golden Eagles players
Managers of baseball teams in Japan